Llanidloes Rugby Football Club is a rugby union team from the town of Llanidloes, mid Wales. Llanidloes RFC is a member of the Welsh Rugby Union  and is a feeder club for RGC.

The Rugby club, based at Cae Hafren, is also a venue for larger, more significant rugby matches and events than the league games on Saturdays. Llanidloes RFC also fields teams from U8 - Youth age including girls teams.

References

Welsh rugby union teams
Llanidloes